Giovanni Colonna (1456 – 26 September 1508) was a Roman Catholic cardinal of the High Renaissance period, a member of the famous Colonna family.

Biography
Colonna was born in Rome in 1456, a grandson of Lorenzo Onofrio Colonna. 

He was created a cardinal by Pope Sixtus IV in the consistory of 15 May 1480 and was made bishop of Rieti on 10 November of that year. He participated in the conclaves of 1484, 1492, September 1503 and October 1503. Colonna died in 1508. Colonna's funeral oration was written by Battista Casali. Giovanni Colonna's nephew Pompeo Colonna succeeded him as Bishop of Rieti.

Cultural depictions
Cardinal Colonna appears in the 2011 TV series Borgia, played by Karel Dobrý.

References

1456 births
1508 deaths
16th-century Italian cardinals
Giovanni
Bishops of Rieti
15th-century Italian cardinals
Clergy from Rome